The 2021–22 Washington Capitals season was the 48th season for the National Hockey League franchise that was established on June 11, 1974. On April 17, 2022, the Capitals clinched a playoff spot after the New York Islanders lost to the Toronto Maple Leafs. The Capitals were defeated in the first round by the Florida Panthers, in six games.

Standings

Divisional standings

Conference standings

Schedule and results

Regular season 
The regular season schedule was released on July 22, 2021.

|- style="background:#cfc;"
| 1 || October 13 || New York Rangers || 5–1 ||  || Vanecek || 18,573 || 1–0–0 || 2 || 
|-style="background:#fff;"
| 2 || October 16 || Tampa Bay || 1–2 || OT || Vanecek || 18,573 || 1–0–1 || 3 || 
|- style="background:#cfc;"
| 3 || October 19 || Colorado || 6–3 ||  || Samsonov || 18,573 || 2–0–1 || 5 || 
|- style="background:#cfc;"
| 4 || October 21 || @ New Jersey || 4–1 ||  || Vanecek || 12,377 || 3–0–1 || 7 || 
|- style="background:#fff;"
| 5 || October 23 || Calgary || 3–4 || OT || Samsonov || 18,573 || 3–0–2 || 8 || 
|- style="background:#cfc;"
| 6 || October 25 || @ Ottawa || 7–5 ||  || Samsonov || 11,387 || 4–0–2 || 10 || 
|- style="background:#fff;"
| 7 || October 27 || Detroit || 2–3 || OT || Vanecek || 18,573 || 4–0–3 || 11 || 
|- style="background:#cfc;"
| 8 || October 29 || Arizona || 2–0 ||  || Samsonov || 18,573 || 5–0–3 || 13 || 
|-

|- style="background:#fcc;"
| 9 || November 1 || @ Tampa Bay Lightning || 2–3 ||  || Vanecek || 19,092 || 5–1–3 || 13 || 
|- style="background:#fff;"
| 10 || November 4 || @ Florida Panthers || 4–5 || OT || Vanecek || 12,542 || 5–1–4 || 14 || 
|- style="background:#fcc;"
| 11 || November 6 || Philadelphia Flyers || 1–2 || || Vanecek || 18,573 || 5–2–4 || 14 || 
|- style="background:#cfc;"
| 12 || November 8 || Buffalo Sabres || 5–3 || || Vanecek || 18,573 || 6–2–4 || 16 || 
|- style="background:#cfc;"
| 13 || November 11 || @ Detroit Red Wings || 2–0 || || Fucale || 16,812 || 7–2–4 || 18 || 
|- style="background:#cfc;"
| 14 || November 12 || @ Columbus Blue Jackets || 4–3 || || Samsonov || 16,985 || 8–2–4 || 20 || 
|- style="background:#cfc;"
| 15 || November 14 || Pittsburgh Penguins || 6–1 || || Vanecek || 18,573 || 9–2–4 || 22 || 
|- style="background:#fff;"
| 16 || November 16 || @ Anaheim Ducks || 2–3 || OT || Vanecek || 13,456 || 9–2–5 || 23 || 
|- style="background:#cfc;"
| 17 || November 17 || @ Los Angeles Kings || 2–0 || || Samsonov || 14,694 || 10–2–5 || 25 || 
|- style="background:#cfc;"
| 18 || November 20 || @ San Jose Sharks || 4–0 || || Samsonov || 16,527 || 11–2–5 || 27 || 
|- style="background:#fcc;"
| 19 || November 21 || @ Seattle Kraken || 2–5 || || Vanecek || 17,151 || 11–3–5 || 27 || 
|- style="background:#cfc;"
| 20 || November 24 || Montreal Canadiens || 6–3 || || Samsonov || 18,573 || 12–3–5 || 29 || 
|- style="background:#cfc;"
| 21 || November 26 || Florida Panthers || 4–3 || || Samsonov || 18,573 || 13–3–5 || 31 || 
|- style="background:#cfc;"
| 22 || November 28 || @ Carolina Hurricanes || 4–2 || || Samsonov || 18,815 || 14–3–5 || 33 || 
|- style="background:#fcc;"
| 23 || November 30 || @ Florida Panthers || 4–5 || || Samsonov || 12,365 || 14–4–5 || 33 || 
|-

|- style="background:#fff;"
| 24 || December 2 || Chicago Blackhawks || 3–4 || SO || Vanecek || 18,573 || 14–4–6 || 34 || 
|- style="background:#cfc;"
| 25 || December 4 || Columbus Blue Jackets || 3–1 ||  || Samsonov || 18,573 || 15–4–6 || 36 || 
|- style="background:#cfc;"
| 26 || December 6 || Anaheim Ducks || 4–3 || SO || Samsonov || 18,573 || 16–4–6 || 38 || 
|- style="background:#fcc;"
| 27 || December 10 || Pittsburgh Penguins || 2–4 ||  || Samsonov || 18,573 || 16–5–6 || 38 || 
|- style="background:#cfc;"
| 28 || December 11 || @ Buffalo Sabres || 3–2 || SO || Vanecek || 9,554 || 17–5–6 || 40 || 
|- style="background:#fff;"
| 29 || December 15 || @ Chicago Blackhawks || 4–5 || OT || Samsonov || 18,260 || 17–5–7 || 41 || 
|- style="background:#cfc;"
| 30 || December 17 || @ Winnipeg Jets || 5–2 ||  || Vanecek || 14,039 || 18–5–7 || 43 || 
|- style="background:#fcc;"
| 31 || December 19 || Los Angeles Kings || 2–3 ||  || Vanecek || 18,573 || 18–6–7 || 43 || 
|- style="background:#ccc;"
| — || December 21 || @ Philadelphia Flyers || colspan="8"|Postponed due to COVID-19. Moved to February 17.
|- style="background:#ccc;"
| — || December 23 || @ New York Islanders || colspan="8"|Postponed due to COVID-19. Moved to April 28.
|- style="background:#ccc;"
| — || December 27 || Ottawa Senators || colspan="8"|Postponed due to COVID-19. Moved to February 13.
|- style="background:#cfc;"
| 32 || December 29 || Nashville Predators || 5–3 ||  || Samsonov || 18,573 || 19–6–7 || 45 || 
|- style="background:#cfc;"
| 33 || December 31 || @ Detroit Red Wings || 3–1 ||  || Samsonov || 17,721 || 20–6–7 || 47 || 

|- style="background:#fff;"
| 34 || January 2 || New Jersey Devils || 3–4 || OT || Samsonov || 18,573 || 20–6–8 || 48 || 
|- style="background:#ccc;"
| — || January 4 || @ Montreal Canadiens || colspan="7"|Postponed due to attendance restrictions. Moved to February 10.
|- style="background:#fcc;"
| 35 || January 7 || @ St. Louis Blues || 1–5 || || Samsonov || 18,096 || 20–7–8 || 48 || 
|- style="background:#fff;"
| 36 || January 8 || @ Minnesota Wild || 2–3 || SO || Fucale || 19,078 || 20–7–9 || 49 || 
|- style="background:#fcc;"
| 37 || January 10 || Boston Bruins || 3–7 ||  || Fucale || 18,573 || 20–8–9 || 49 || 
|- style="background:#cfc;"
| 38 || January 15 || @ New York Islanders || 2–0 ||  || Vanecek || 17,255 || 21–8–9 || 51 || 
|- style="background:#fcc;"
| 39 || January 16 || Vancouver Canucks || 2–4 ||  || Samsonov || 18,573 || 21–9–9 || 51 || 
|- style="background:#cfc;"
| 40 || January 18 || Winnipeg Jets || 4–3 || OT || Vanecek || 18,573 || 22–9–9 || 53 || 
|- style="background:#fcc;"
| 41 || January 20 || @ Boston Bruins || 3–4 ||  || Vanecek || 17,850 || 22–10–9 || 53 || 
|- style="background:#cfc;"
| 42 || January 22 || Ottawa Senators || 2–3 || OT || Vanecek || 18,573 || 23–10–9 || 55 || 
|- style="background:#fcc;"
| 43 || January 24 || Vegas Golden Knights || 0–1 ||  || Vanecek || 18,573 || 23–11–9 || 55 || 
|- style="background:#fcc;"
| 44 || January 26 || San Jose Sharks || 1–4 ||  || Samsonov || 18,573 || 23–12–9 || 55 || 
|- style="background:#cfc;"
| 45 || January 28 || @ Dallas Stars || 5–0 ||  || Vanecek || 18,532 || 24–12–9 || 57 || 

|- style="background:#cfc;"
| 46 || February 1 || @ Pittsburgh Penguins || 4–3 || OT || Samsonov || 17,826 || 25–12–9 || 59 || 
|- style="background:#fcc;"
| 47 || February 2 || Edmonton Oilers || 3–5 || || Copley || 18,573 || 25–13–9 || 59 || 
|- style="background:#fcc;"
| 48 || February 8 || Columbus Blue Jackets || 4–5 ||  || Samsonov || 18,573 || 25–14–9 || 59 || 
|- style="background:#cfc;"
| 49 || February 10 || @ Montreal Canadiens || 5–2 ||  || Samsonov || 500 || 26–14–9 || 61 || 
|- style="background:#fcc;"
| 50 || February 13 || Ottawa Senators || 1–4 ||  || Samsonov || 18,573 || 26–15–9 || 61 || 
|- style="background:#cfc;"
| 51 || February 15 || @ Nashville Predators || 4–1 ||  || Samsonov || 17,238 || 27–15–9 || 63 || 
|- style="background:#cfc;"
| 52 || February 17 || @ Philadelphia Flyers || 5–3 ||  || Samsonov || 16,886 || 28–15–9 || 65 || 
|- style="background:#fcc;"
| 53 || February 24 || @ New York Rangers || 1–4 ||  || Samsonov || 18,006 || 28–16–9 || 65 || 
|- style="background:#fcc;"
| 54 || February 26 || @ Philadelphia Flyers || 1–2 ||  || Samsonov || 18,276 || 28–17–9 || 65 || 
|- style="background:#fcc;"
| 55 || February 28 || Toronto Maple Leafs || 3–5 ||  || Vanecek || 18,573 || 28–18–9 || 65 || 

|- style="background:#cfc;"
| 56 || March 3 || Carolina Hurricanes || 4–0 ||  || Vanecek || 18,573 || 29–18–9 || 67 || 
|- style="background:#cfc;"
| 57 || March 5 || Seattle Kraken || 5–2 ||  || Vanecek || 18,573 || 30–18–9 || 69 || 
|- style="background:#cfc;"
| 58 || March 8 || @ Calgary Flames || 5–4 ||  || Vanecek || 15,628 || 31–18–9 || 71 || 
|- style="background:#fff;"
| 59 || March 9 || @ Edmonton Oilers || 3–4 || OT || Samsonov || 16,368 || 31–18–10 || 72 || 
|- style="background:#cfc;"
| 60 || March 11 || @ Vancouver Canucks || 4–3 || OT || Vanecek || 18,814 || 32–18–10 || 74 || 
|- style="background:#cfc;"
| 61 || March 15 || New York Islanders || 4–3 || SO || Vanecek || 18,573 || 33–18–10 || 76 || 
|- style="background:#cfc;"
| 62 || March 17 || @ Columbus Blue Jackets || 7–2 ||  || Vanecek || 15,911 || 34–18–10 || 78 || 
|- style="background:#cfc;"
| 63 || March 18 || @ Carolina Hurricanes || 4–3 || SO || Samsonov || 18,680 || 35–18–10 || 80 || 
|- style="background:#fcc;"
| 64 || March 20 || Dallas Stars || 2–3 ||  || Vanecek || 18,573 || 35–19–10 || 80 || 
|- style="background:#fcc;"
| 65 || March 22 || St. Louis Blues || 2–5 ||  || Vanecek || 18,573 || 35–20–10 || 80 || 
|- style="background:#cfc;"
| 66 || March 25 || @ Buffalo Sabres || 4–3 || SO || Samsonov || 9,740 || 36–20–10 || 82 || 
|- style="background:#cfc;"
| 67 || March 26 || New Jersey Devils || 4–3 ||  || Vanecek || 18,573 || 37–20–10 || 84 || 
|- style="background:#fcc;"
| 68 || March 28 || Carolina Hurricanes || 1–6 ||  || Vanecek || 18,573 || 37–21–10 || 84 || 

|- style="background:#fcc;"
| 69 || April 3 || Minnesota Wild || 1–5 || || Vanecek || 18,573 || 37–22–10 || 84 || 
|- style="background:#cfc;"
| 70 || April 6 || Tampa Bay Lightning || 4–3 || || Samsonov || 18,573 || 38–22–10 || 86 || 
|- style="background:#cfc;"
| 71 || April 9 || @ Pittsburgh Penguins || 6–3 || || Samsonov || 18,404 || 39–22–10 || 88 || 
|- style="background:#cfc;"
| 72 || April 10 || Boston Bruins || 4–2 || || Vanecek || 18,573 || 40–22–10 || 90 || 
|- style="background:#cfc;"
| 73 || April 12 || Philadelphia Flyers || 9–2 ||  || Samsonov || 18,573 || 41–22–10 || 92 || 
|- style="background:#fcc;"
| 74 || April 14 || @ Toronto Maple Leafs || 3–7 ||  || Samsonov || 18,466 || 41–23–10 || 92 || 
|- style="background:#cfc;"
| 75 || April 16 || @ Montreal Canadiens || 8–4 ||  || Vanecek || 21,105 || 42–23–10 || 94 || 
|- style="background:#cfc;"
| 76 || April 18 || @ Colorado Avalanche || 3–2 ||  || Samsonov || 18,020 || 43–23–10 || 96 || 
|- style="background:#fff;"
| 77 || April 20 || @ Vegas Golden Knights || 3–4 || OT || Samsonov || 18,240 || 43–23–11 || 97 || 
|- style="background:#cfc;"
| 78 || April 22 || @ Arizona Coyotes || 2–0 ||  || Vanecek || 14,053 || 44–23–11 || 99 || 
|- style="background:#fff;"
| 79 || April 24 || Toronto Maple Leafs || 3–4 || SO || Vanecek || 18,573 || 44–23–12 || 100 || 
|- style="background:#fcc;"
| 80 || April 26 || New York Islanders || 1–4 ||  || Samsonov || 18,573 || 44–24–12 || 100 || 
|- style="background:#fcc;"
| 81 || April 28 || @ New York Islanders || 1–5 ||  || Vanecek || 16,722 || 44–25–12 || 100 || 
|- style="background:#fcc;"
| 82 || April 29 || @ New York Rangers || 2–3 ||  || Samsonov || 17,230 || 44–26–12 || 100 || 
|-

|-
|

Playoffs

|- style="background:#cfc;"
| 1 || May 3 || @ Florida || 4–2 ||  || Vanecek || 19,678 || 1–0 || 
|- style="background:#fcc;"
| 2 || May 5 || @ Florida || 1–5 ||  || Vanecek || 19,636 || 1–1 || 
|- style="background:#cfc;"
| 3 || May 7 || Florida || 6–1 ||  || Samsonov || 18,573 || 2–1 || 
|- style="background:#fcc;"
| 4 || May 9 || Florida || 2–3 || OT || Samsonov || 18,573 || 2–2 || 
|- style="background:#fcc;"
| 5 || May 11 || @ Florida || 3–5 ||  || Samsonov || 20,023 || 2–3 || 
|- style="background:#fcc;"
| 6 || May 13 || Florida || 3–4 || OT || Samsonov || 18,573 || 2–4 ||  
|-

|-
|

Player statistics 
As of April 29, 2022

Skaters

Goaltenders 

†Denotes player spent time with another team before joining the Capitals. Stats reflect time with the Capitals only.
‡Denotes player was traded mid-season. Stats reflect time with the Capitals only.
Bold/italics denotes franchise record.

Transactions 
The Capitals have been involved in the following transactions during the 2021–22 season.

Trades 

Notes:
  Arizona will receive a third-round pick in 2024 if Colorado wins the 2022 Stanley Cup and Kuemper in 50% of their playoff games; otherwise no pick will be exchanged.

Players acquired

Players lost

Signings

Draft picks 

Below are the Washington Capitals' selections at the 2021 NHL Entry Draft, which were held on July 23 to 24, 2021. It was held virtually via Video conference call from the NHL Network studio in Secaucus, New Jersey.

References 

Washington Capitals seasons
Capitals
Washington Capitals
Washington Capitals